Metawin Opas-iamkajorn (born 21 February 1999), better known by his nickname Win is a Thai actor and model of Chinese descent, who made his debut in 2020.

Education and personal life 
Metawin was born in Bangkok, Thailand and he is the third among four siblings Mintra, Mesa and Metas Opas-iamkajorn.

He started his studies at Denla Kindergarten School, and went to Assumption College a private Catholic boys school in Bangkok for his primary education, and had a brief summer course at Assumption College Bangrak. He then went to Panyarat High School for secondary education. In March and April of 2015, he participated in a 42-day summer program in Taiwan for the purpose of studying the Mandarin language and experiencing cultural exchange. In the 11th grade he went to Belmond–Klemme Community School District in Iowa, United States as an exchange student where he passed the General Education Development (GED). When he returned, he skipped the 12th grade and went straight to study in the faculty of economics international program at one of the universities with the most competitive entrance exams in Thailand Thammasat University, until he graduated in 2020. His graduation ceremony which has been postponed for 2 years due to the covid-19 pandemic finally be held on May 27th 2022.

During his time as an exchange student Metawin actively participated in his school's extracurricular activities, he became a member of the school band's percussion choir where his group received a superior (Division I) rating. he also played American football and was part of his high school's soccer team.

He used to play golf competitively during his childhood and won several tournaments but had to quit due to injury. He still continue playing golf recreationally as is often seen on his social media.

He is fluent in 3 languages: Thai, English and Chinese.

In June 2020, Metawin launched his own sustainable fashion brand "VELENCE" who committed to donate part of its revenue to orphanages. In December 2020, the brand donated 100,000 baht each to Baan Phra Phon Foundation, Queen Sirikit National Institute of Child Health (Children's Hospital), The Orphanage of the Thai Red Cross Society, Thai Red Cross Society, and Mahamek Home for Children.

Later in the same year, he launched "SOURI" a confectionery business he co-owns with his sister, Mintra Opas-iamkajorn a Le Cordon Bleu alumni who also has Msc (master of science degree) in food quality and innovation from the University of Leeds.

Metawin's family owns a female Chihuahua dog named Charlotte, and in 2021, they adopted a pair of Shetland Sheepdogs named them Bentley and Cartier.

He launched his third business "VELATO" a premium ice cream brand that started receiving their first order on September 9th 2021.

Career and influence 
Metawin entered the entertainment industry as a trainee actor under ONE31 for about a year before moving to an actor contract under GMMTV in 2019. He is known for his acting debut and leading role in 2gether: The Series which brought him to international prominence.   

He officially named his fandom "snowball power". the announcement was made on his Twitter account on February 11, 2020. The following years, his fans celebrate the anniversary of the fandom on that day.

In the first year of his career he is named as one of the 100 Influential People in the Fashion Industry of Thailand by Vogue Magazine. He also part of the HOWE Magazine "The 50 Influential People" alongside other influencers, businessmen, and executives who have achieved success in various fields.

Due to his popularity and online presence he is signed with many local and international brands as an endorser and brand ambassador, including Shiseido, Cathy Doll, Colly Collagen, Oishi, Voodoo Pillow, Mama OK, Dunkin Donuts, Mistine, Mali, Lazada, CP Brand, DEOKLEAR, Olay, Dutch Mill, Vivo, Isuzu, TJ Nude, KFC, TaoKaeNoi, Sunsilk, Globe Telecom and many others.

In July 2020, Metawin lent his voice to the "THE SOUND OF HAPPINESS" campaign, a joint initiative between UNICEF, the Department of Mental Health, and JOOX aimed at promoting mental health and empowering young people in Thailand. As a well-known actor, Metawin shared his own experiences of dealing with stress and pressure during his adolescence, encouraging young people to seek help when needed. He was among 12 famous artists and influencers who volunteered to share their personal stories to make the campaign more relatable and accessible to young people. Through his participation in this campaign, he played a vital role in raising awareness of mental health issues and promoting positive energy and resilience among young people in Thailand.

In September 2020 he is cast as one of the F4 members in Thailand's adaptation of Boys Over Flowers.
In February 2021, Metawin became the first Thai artist to be advertised in space after one of his Chinese fanclubs organized a birthday project for the actor to be greeted via the Ladybeetle-1 commercial satellite. The advertisement, dubbed Into the Galaxy-Special Mission, displayed a photo of Metawin as the satellite orbited the earth on 17 February, his date of birth according to the Gregorian calendar.

Following the international success of his debut series, Japanese film distribution companies approached GMMTV with offers for film projects. 2gether: The Movie premiered in Tokyo and was initially scheduled to show in 30 cinemas across Japan in 2021, but due to its overwhelmingly positive response, it was eventually shown in almost 100 theaters in total. The Japanese release of the 2gether special album also received a warm reception, ranking third on Oricon Daily Album Charts on the day of its release, and subsequently ranking 7th on Oricon Weekly Album Charts and 4th on Billboard Japan Weekly Album Sales.

He is the Thai actor who gained the most Instagram followers in 2021 and the first half of 2022.

In November 2021 his third drama series Devil Sister was announced at GMMTV's "BORDERLESS" event.

Metawin is trained by one of the most prominent acting coaches in Thailand, Rossukon Kongkate.

He is one of the Influencers who contribute the highest EMV (Earned Media Value) for Milan Fashion Week Autumn-Winter 2022 with his partnership with Gucci and Dolce & Gabbana.

Sitting in the front row at Louis Vuitton Fall-Winter 2022 Men's Spin-Off Show in Bangkok. Metawin is one of the most popular celebrities who can attract a high volume of social buzz and digital traffic at the moment.

According to Launchmetrics Metawin ranked first as top voice, post and influencer in Milan Men's Fashion Week for his appearance in the front row of Prada Spring-Summer 2023 Runway Show. He generated $4.7M in MIV (Media Impact Value) across 257 placements where he generated $1.3M in MIV with only one post.

On January 6, 2023, Italian luxury fashion house Prada appointed Metawin Opas-Iamkajorn as their global brand ambassador. He reportedly contributed $9.8 million in EMV (Earned Media Value) to the brand in 2022, the highest amount of EMV for a Thailand-based celebrity that year. In a press statement, Prada also announced that Metawin will make an appearance at the Prada fall/winter 2023 men's show in Milan on January 15, 2023. According to data and technology company Launchmetrix, his attendance generated $3.8 million in MIV (Media Impact Value) for the brand.

Filmography

Film

Television series

Variety show

Music video appearance

Discography

OST and tie-ins

Soundtrack Album

Single

Accolades

Awards and nominations

Listicles

References

External links
 
 
 
 
 

1999 births
Living people
Metawin Opas-iamkajorn
Metawin Opas-iamkajorn
Metawin Opas-iamkajorn
Metawin Opas-iamkajorn
Metawin Opas-iamkajorn